A triduum (plural: tridua) is a religious observance lasting three days.

Major tridua
The best-known and most significant example today is the liturgical Paschal Triduum (the three days from the evening of Maundy Thursday to Easter Sunday). Other liturgical tridua celebrated in Western Christianity include the Rogation Days preceding Ascension Thursday, the feasts of Christmas and Pentecost together with the first two days of their octave, and Allhallowtide that lasts from Halloween to All Souls Day.

In Eastern Christianity (both Orthodox and Catholic) the analogues of festive tridua take the form of a major feasts followed by an associated Synaxis. The most publicly celebrated examples are the feast of Epiphany together with its eve and the following day dedicated to Saint John the Baptist, and the Nativity feast with Christmas Eve and the Synaxis of Theotokos. 

Ecclesiastical approval has been granted for tridua in honour of the Trinity, the Eucharist and Saint Joseph. Tridua are also celebrated on the local level, often preceding the feasts of patron saints of parishes and localities. An example would be the Obando Fertility Rites in the Philippines, which commemorate Saint Paschal Baylon, Saint Clare of Assisi (in addition to her actual feast day), and Our Lady of Salambáo for three consecutive days in mid-May.

Other occasions
Many other tridua are celebrated on occasions such as when children are preparing for their First Communion; among pupils as well as seminarians at the beginning of the school year; and in religious communities for those who are preparing to renew their vows annually or every six months.

See also 
 Allhallowtide
 Holy Week
 Holy Week procession
 Novena, Octave (liturgy)

References 

Catholic devotions
Catholic liturgy
Catholic spirituality
Holy Week
Latin religious words and phrases